Heptacodon is an extinct genus of anthracothere endemic to North America during the Paleogene (from the middle Eocene to the early Oligocene). They were medium to large-sized anthracotheres with a distinct facial features such short heavy rostrums and robust but simple molars. Heptacodon is a member of the anthracothere subfamily Anthracotheriinae, whose distribution as a whole are in North America and Eurasia. However Heptacodon has only been found in North America, with the species H. yeguaensis from Texas representing the oldest known anthracotheres to be found in North America dating to the middle Eocene. Fossils of this genus have been found in the states of North Dakota, Oregon, South Dakota, Texas, and Utah.

References

Anthracotheres
Oligocene even-toed ungulates
Eocene even-toed ungulates
Eocene genus first appearances
Prehistoric even-toed ungulate genera